Cristorhodopina mussardi is a species of beetle in the family Cerambycidae, and the only species in the genus Cristorhodopina. It was described by Stephan von Breuning in 1966.

References

Lamiinae
Beetles described in 1966